In algebra, a quadratic equation is any equation that can be rearranged in standard form as

(If  and  then the equation is linear, not quadratic.)

The values of  that satisfy the equation are called solutions of the equation, and roots or zeros of the expression on its left-hand side. A quadratic equation has at most two solutions. If there is only one solution, one says that it is a double root. If all the coefficients are real numbers, there are either two real solutions, or a single real double root, or two complex solutions that are complex conjugates of each other. A quadratic equation always has two roots, if complex roots are included; and a double root is counted for two. A quadratic equation can be factored into an equivalent equation 

The quadratic formula

Completing the square is one of several ways for deriving the formula.

Solutions to problems that can be expressed in terms of quadratic equations were known as early as 2000 BC.

Because the quadratic equation involves only one unknown, it is called "univariate". The quadratic equation contains only powers of  that are non-negative integers, and therefore it is a polynomial equation. In particular, it is a second-degree polynomial equation, since the greatest power is two.

Solving the quadratic equation

A quadratic equation with real or complex coefficients has two solutions, called roots. These two solutions may or may not be distinct, and they may or may not be real.

Factoring by inspection
It may be possible to express a quadratic equation  as a product . In some cases, it is possible, by simple inspection, to determine values of p, q, r, and s that make the two forms equivalent to one another. Solving these two linear equations provides the roots of the quadratic.

For most students, factoring by inspection is the first method of solving quadratic equations to which they are exposed. The more general case where  does not equal  can require a considerable effort in trial and error guess-and-check, assuming that it can be factored at all by inspection.

This means that the great majority of quadratic equations that arise in practical applications cannot be solved by factoring by inspection.

Completing the square

The process of completing the square makes use of the algebraic identity

which represents a well-defined algorithm that can be used to solve any quadratic equation. Starting with a quadratic equation in standard form,  
Subtract the constant term  from both sides.
This "completes the square", converting the left side into a perfect square.
Write the left side as a square and simplify the right side if necessary.
Produce two linear equations by equating the square root of the left side with the positive and negative square roots of the right side.
Solve each of the two linear equations.

We illustrate use of this algorithm by solving 

Quadratic formula and its derivation 

Completing the square can be used to derive a general formula for solving quadratic equations, called the quadratic formula. The mathematical proof will now be briefly summarized.  It can easily be seen, by polynomial expansion, that the following equation is equivalent to the quadratic equation:

Taking the square root of both sides, and isolating , gives:

These result in slightly different forms for the solution, but are otherwise equivalent.

A number of alternative derivations can be found in the literature.  These proofs are simpler than the standard completing the square method, represent interesting applications of other frequently used techniques in algebra, or offer insight into other areas of mathematics.

A lesser known quadratic formula, as used in Muller's method, provides the same roots via the equation
 

One property of this form is that it yields one valid root when , while the other root contains division by zero, because when , the quadratic equation becomes a linear equation, which has one root. By contrast, in this case, the more common formula has a division by zero for one root and an indeterminate form  for the other root. On the other hand, when , the more common formula yields two correct roots whereas this form yields the zero root and an indeterminate form .

When neither  nor  is zero, the equality between the standard quadratic formula and Muller's method,

can be verified by cross multiplication, and similarly for the other choice of signs.

Reduced quadratic equation
It is sometimes convenient to reduce a quadratic equation so that its leading coefficient is one. This produces the reduced quadratic equation:

This monic polynomial equation has the same solutions as the original.

The quadratic formula for the solutions of the reduced quadratic equation, written in terms of its coefficients, is:

or equivalently:

Discriminant

In the quadratic formula, the expression underneath the square root sign is called the discriminant of the quadratic equation, and is often represented using an upper case  or an upper case Greek delta:

A quadratic equation with real coefficients can have either one or two distinct real roots, or two distinct complex roots. In this case the discriminant determines the number and nature of the roots. There are three cases:

If the discriminant is positive, then there are two distinct roots

both of which are real numbers. For quadratic equations with rational coefficients, if the discriminant is a square number, then the roots are rational—in other cases they may be quadratic irrationals.

If the discriminant is zero, then there is exactly one real root  sometimes called a repeated or double root.

If the discriminant is negative, then there are no real roots. Rather, there are two distinct (non-real) complex roots
which are complex conjugates of each other. In these expressions  is the imaginary unit.

Thus the roots are distinct if and only if the discriminant is non-zero, and the roots are real if and only if the discriminant is non-negative.

Geometric interpretation

The function  is a quadratic function. The graph of any quadratic function has the same general shape, which is called a parabola. As shown in Figure 1, if , the parabola has a minimum point and opens upward. If , the parabola has a maximum point and opens downward. The extreme point of the parabola, whether minimum or maximum, corresponds to its vertex. The -intercept is located at the point .

As shown in Figure 3, if the discriminant is positive, the graph touches the -axis at two points; if zero, the graph touches at one point; and if negative, the graph does not touch the -axis.

Quadratic factorization
The term

is a factor of the polynomial
 
if and only if  is a root of the quadratic equation
 
It follows from the quadratic formula that
 
In the special case  where the quadratic has only one distinct root (i.e. the discriminant is zero), the quadratic polynomial can be factored as

Graphical solution

The solutions of the quadratic equation 

may be deduced from the graph of the quadratic function

which is a parabola.

If the parabola intersects the -axis in two points, there are two real roots, which are the -coordinates of these two points (also called -intercept).

If the parabola is tangent to the -axis, there is a double root, which is the -coordinate of the contact point between the graph and parabola.

If the parabola does not intersect the -axis, there are two complex conjugate roots. Although these roots cannot be visualized on the graph, their real and imaginary parts can be.

Let  and  be respectively the -coordinate and the -coordinate of the vertex of the parabola (that is the point with maximal or minimal -coordinate. The quadratic function may be rewritten
 
Let  be the distance between the point of -coordinate  on the axis of the parabola, and a point on the parabola with the same -coordinate (see the figure; there are two such points, which give the same distance, because of the symmetry of the parabola). That is, the roots are 

or in the case of the example of the figure

Avoiding loss of significance
Although the quadratic formula provides an exact solution, the result is not exact if real numbers are approximated during the computation, as usual in numerical analysis, where real numbers are approximated by floating point numbers (called "reals" in many programming languages). In this context, the quadratic formula is not completely stable.

In this case, the subtraction of two nearly equal numbers will cause loss of significance or catastrophic cancellation in the smaller root. To avoid this, the root that is smaller in magnitude, can be computed as  where  is the root that is bigger in magnitude. This is equivalent to using the formula

using the plus sign if  and the minus sign if 

This can lead to loss of up to half of correct significant figures in the roots.

Examples and applications

The golden ratio is found as the positive solution of the quadratic equation 

The equations of the circle and the other conic sections—ellipses, parabolas, and hyperbolas—are quadratic equations in two variables.

Given the cosine or sine of an angle, finding the cosine or sine of the angle that is half as large involves solving a quadratic equation.

The process of simplifying expressions involving the square root of an expression involving the square root of another expression involves finding the two solutions of a quadratic equation.

Descartes' theorem states that for every four kissing (mutually tangent) circles, their radii satisfy a particular quadratic equation.

The equation given by Fuss' theorem, giving the relation among the radius of a bicentric quadrilateral's inscribed circle, the radius of its circumscribed circle, and the distance between the centers of those circles, can be expressed as a quadratic equation for which the distance between the two circles' centers in terms of their radii is one of the solutions. The other solution of the same equation in terms of the relevant radii gives the distance between the circumscribed circle's center and the center of the excircle of an ex-tangential quadrilateral.

Critical points of a cubic function and inflection points of a quartic function are found by solving a quadratic equation.

History
Babylonian mathematicians, as early as 2000 BC (displayed on Old Babylonian clay tablets) could solve problems relating the areas and sides of rectangles. There is evidence dating this algorithm as far back as the Third Dynasty of Ur. In modern notation, the problems typically involved solving a pair of simultaneous equations of the form:

Compute half of p.
Square the result.
Subtract q.
Find the (positive) square root using a table of squares.
Add together the results of steps (1) and (4) to give .

Geometric methods were used to solve quadratic equations in Babylonia, Egypt, Greece, China, and India. The Egyptian Berlin Papyrus, dating back to the Middle Kingdom (2050 BC to 1650 BC), contains the solution to a two-term quadratic equation. Babylonian mathematicians from circa 400 BC and Chinese mathematicians from circa 200 BC used geometric methods of dissection to solve quadratic equations with positive roots. Rules for quadratic equations were given in The Nine Chapters on the Mathematical Art, a Chinese treatise on mathematics. These early geometric methods do not appear to have had a general formula. Euclid, the Greek mathematician, produced a more abstract geometrical method around 300 BC. With a purely geometric approach Pythagoras and Euclid created a general procedure to find solutions of the quadratic equation. In his work Arithmetica, the Greek mathematician Diophantus solved the quadratic equation, but giving only one root, even when both roots were positive.

In 628 AD, Brahmagupta, an Indian mathematician, gave the first explicit (although still not completely general) solution of the quadratic equation  as follows: "To the absolute number multiplied by four times the [coefficient of the] square, add the square of the [coefficient of the] middle term; the square root of the same, less the [coefficient of the] middle term, being divided by twice the [coefficient of the] square is the value." (Brahmasphutasiddhanta, Colebrook translation, 1817, page 346) This is equivalent to

The Bakhshali Manuscript written in India in the 7th century AD contained an algebraic formula for solving quadratic equations, as well as quadratic indeterminate equations (originally of type ). Muhammad ibn Musa al-Khwarizmi (9th century), possibly inspired by Brahmagupta, developed a set of formulas that worked for positive solutions. Al-Khwarizmi goes further in providing a full solution to the general quadratic equation, accepting one or two numerical answers for every quadratic equation, while providing geometric proofs in the process. He also described the method of completing the square and recognized that the discriminant must be positive, which was proven by his contemporary 'Abd al-Hamīd ibn Turk (Central Asia, 9th century) who gave geometric figures to prove that if the discriminant is negative, a quadratic equation has no solution. While al-Khwarizmi himself did not accept negative solutions, later Islamic mathematicians that succeeded him accepted negative solutions, as well as irrational numbers as solutions. Abū Kāmil Shujā ibn Aslam (Egypt, 10th century) in particular was the first to accept irrational numbers (often in the form of a square root, cube root or fourth root) as solutions to quadratic equations or as coefficients in an equation. The 9th century Indian mathematician Sridhara wrote down rules for solving quadratic equations.

The Jewish mathematician Abraham bar Hiyya Ha-Nasi (12th century, Spain) authored the first European book to include the full solution to the general quadratic equation. His solution was largely based on Al-Khwarizmi's work. The writing of the Chinese mathematician Yang Hui (1238–1298 AD) is the first known one in which quadratic equations with negative coefficients of 'x' appear, although he attributes this to the earlier Liu Yi. By 1545 Gerolamo Cardano compiled the works related to the quadratic equations. The quadratic formula covering all cases was first obtained by Simon Stevin in 1594. In 1637 René Descartes published La Géométrie containing the quadratic formula in the form we know today.

Advanced topics

Alternative methods of root calculation

Vieta's formulas

Vieta's formulas (named after François Viète) are the relations
 
between the roots of a quadratic polynomial and its coefficients. They result from comparing term by term the relation

with the equation

The first Vieta's formula is useful for graphing a quadratic function. Since the graph is symmetric with respect to a vertical line through the vertex,  the vertex's -coordinate is located at the average of the roots (or intercepts). Thus the -coordinate of the vertex is

The -coordinate can be obtained by substituting the above result into the given quadratic equation, giving

These formulas for the vertex can also deduced directly from the formula (see Completing the square)

For numerical computation, Vieta's formulas provide a useful method for finding the roots of a quadratic equation in the case where one root is much smaller than the other. If , then , and we have the estimate:

The second Vieta's formula then provides:

These formulas are much easier to evaluate than the quadratic formula under the condition of one large and one small root, because the quadratic formula evaluates the small root as the difference of two very nearly equal numbers (the case of large ), which causes round-off error in a numerical evaluation. The figure shows the difference between (i) a direct evaluation using the quadratic formula (accurate when the roots are near each other in value) and (ii) an evaluation based upon the above approximation of Vieta's formulas (accurate when the roots are widely spaced). As the linear coefficient  increases, initially the quadratic formula is accurate, and the approximate formula improves in accuracy, leading to a smaller difference between the methods as  increases. However, at some point the quadratic formula begins to lose accuracy because of round off error, while the approximate method continues to improve. Consequently, the difference between the methods begins to increase as the quadratic formula becomes worse and worse.

This situation arises commonly in amplifier design, where widely separated roots are desired to ensure a stable operation (see Step response).

Trigonometric solution
In the days before calculators, people would use mathematical tables—lists of numbers showing the results of calculation with varying arguments—to simplify and speed up computation. Tables of logarithms and trigonometric functions were common in math and science textbooks. Specialized tables were published for applications such as astronomy, celestial navigation and statistics. Methods of numerical approximation existed, called prosthaphaeresis, that offered shortcuts around time-consuming operations such as multiplication and taking powers and roots. Astronomers, especially, were concerned with methods that could speed up the long series of computations involved in celestial mechanics calculations.

It is within this context that we may understand the development of means of solving quadratic equations by the aid of trigonometric substitution. Consider the following alternate form of the quadratic equation,

[1]   

where the sign of the ± symbol is chosen so that  and  may both be positive. By substituting

[2]   

[3]   

[4]   

[5]   

where the subscripts  and  correspond, respectively, to the use of a negative or positive sign in equation [1]. Complex roots occur in the solution based on equation [5] if the absolute value of  exceeds unity. The amount of effort involved in solving quadratic equations using this mixed trigonometric and logarithmic table look-up strategy was two-thirds the effort using logarithmic tables alone. Calculating complex roots would require using a different trigonometric form.

To illustrate, let us assume we had available seven-place logarithm and trigonometric tables, and wished to solve the following to six-significant-figure accuracy:

A seven-place lookup table might have only 100,000 entries, and computing intermediate results to seven places would generally require interpolation between adjacent entries. 

 (rounded to six significant figures)

Solution for complex roots in polar coordinates

If the quadratic equation  with real coefficients has two complex roots—the case where  requiring a and c to have the same sign as each other—then the solutions for the roots can be expressed in polar form as

where  and

Geometric solution

The quadratic equation may be solved geometrically in a number of ways. One way is via Lill's method. A circle is drawn with the start and end point SC as a diameter. If this cuts the middle line AB of the three then the equation has a solution, and the solutions are given by negative of the distance along this line from A divided by the first coefficient  or SA. If  is  the coefficients may be read off directly. Thus the solutions in the diagram are −AX1/SA and −AX2/SA.

The Carlyle circle, named after Thomas Carlyle, has the property that the solutions of the quadratic equation are the horizontal coordinates of the intersections of the circle with the horizontal axis. Carlyle circles have been used to develop ruler-and-compass constructions of regular polygons.

Generalization of quadratic equation
(In a field of characteristic 2, the element  is zero and it is impossible to divide by it.)

The symbol

In some fields, some elements have no square roots and some have two; only zero has just one square root, except in fields of characteristic . Even if a field does not contain a square root of some number, there is always a quadratic extension field which does, so the quadratic formula will always make sense as a formula in that extension field.

Characteristic 2
In a field of characteristic , the quadratic formula, which relies on  being a unit, does not hold. Consider the monic quadratic polynomial

over a field of characteristic . If , then the solution reduces to extracting a square root, so the solution is

and there is only one root since

In summary,

See quadratic residue for more information about extracting square roots in finite fields.

In the case that , there are two distinct roots, but if the polynomial is irreducible, they cannot be expressed in terms of square roots of numbers in the coefficient field. One verifies that  is also a root. In terms of the 2-root operation, the two roots of the (non-monic) quadratic  are

and

Because ,  is the unique solution of the quadratic equation .

This is a special case of Artin–Schreier theory.

See also
 Solving quadratic equations with continued fractions
 Linear equation
 Cubic function
 Quartic equation
 Quintic equation
 Fundamental theorem of algebra

References

External links

 
 
 101 uses of a quadratic equation 
 101 uses of a quadratic equation: Part II 

Elementary algebra
Equations